The Cameroon sunbird (Cyanomitra oritis) is a species of bird in the family Nectariniidae.
It is found in the Cameroon line (including  Bioko).

References

Cameroon sunbird
Birds of Central Africa
Cameroon sunbird
Taxonomy articles created by Polbot